Hinds is a surname. Notable people with the surname include:

Alfred George Hinds, known as "Alfie Hinds", (1917–1991), English prison escapee
Alfred Walton Hinds (1874–1957), American rear admiral
Alison Hinds (born 1970), soca artist from Barbados
Andrew Hinds (born 1984), athlete from Barbados
Anthony Hinds (1922–2013), film producer and scriptwriter
Bill Hinds, American cartoonist
Brent Hinds, guitarist for Atlanta-based metal band Mastodon
Ciarán Hinds (born 1953), actor from Northern Ireland
Damian Hinds, British politician
David Hinds (born 1956), lead vocalist the reggae group Steel Pulse
Donald Hinds (born 1934), Jamaican-born writer, journalist and historian
Ernest Hinds (1864–1941), American major general
Franklyn Hinds (born 1967), cricketer from the Cayman Islands
Horace Andy (born Horace Hinds, 1951), reggae singer from Jamaica
Jacob Hinds (1800–1873), NY politician
James M. Hinds (1833–1868), congressman from Arkansas
John Hamilton Hinds (1898–1993), American major general
Justin Hinds (1942–2005), ska singer from Jamaica
Kaylen Hinds (born 1998), British footballer
Killick Erik Hinds (born 1972), musician from Georgia, U.S.A.
Lesley Hinds, politician from Scotland
Lukas Hinds-Johnson, German rugby international
Martin Hinds (1941–1988), historian who specialised in early Islam
Mavis Hinds (1929–2009), English meteorologist
Richard Hinds (born 1980), footballer
Richard Brinsley Hinds (1811-1846), British naval surgeon, botanist and malacologist
Ryan Hinds (born 1981), cricketer from Barbados
Sam Hinds (born 1943), Prime Minister of Guyana from 1999
Sam Hinds (baseball) (born 1953), Major League Baseball player
Samuel S. Hinds (1875–1948), American actor
Taylor Hinds (born 1999), English women's footballer
Thomas Hinds (1780–1840), politician from Mississippi
Wavell Hinds (born 1976), cricketer from Jamaica
William Hinds (1887–1957), entrepreneur, jeweller, comedian and film studio owner

See also
 Hinds (disambiguation)
 Hind (disambiguation)
 Hinde (surname)

Surnames from nicknames